All Hands on Deck is a 1961 American DeLuxe musical film in CinemaScope directed by Norman Taurog and starring Pat Boone as a naval officer. It is based on the novel Warm Bodies by Donald R. Morris.

Plot
Lt Donald (Pat Boone) of the US Navy is assigned to look after a troublesome sailor, Garfield (Buddy Hackett), who is from an oil-rich Indian tribe. He also romances journalist Sally Hobson (Barbara Eden).

Cast
 Pat Boone as Lieutenant Victor 'Vic' Donald
 Buddy Hackett as Garfield 
 Dennis O'Keefe as Lieutenant Commander O'Gara 
 Barbara Eden as Sally Hobson 
 Warren Berlinger as Ensign Rush 
 Gale Gordon as Admiral Bintle 
 David Brandon as Lieutenant Kutley

Original novel
The film was based on a 1957 novel, Warm Bodies by Donald R. Morris, based on his experiences in the Navy. The New York Times described it as "a delightful book, fresh, warmhearted and full of fun." The Los Angeles Times called it "the best funny novel about the navy since... Mr Roberts".

Production
In 1958 screenwriter Jay Sommers optioned the rights to the novel and wrote a script, which he succeeded in selling to 20th Century Fox as a vehicle for Pat Boone. Part of the deal was that Sommers was kept on as writer; Oscar Brodney was assigned to produce.

It was Pat Boone's first film in a number of months. He had been studying with Sanford Meisner for two years and felt in this film he was finally a "good actor".

Diana Dors was mentioned as a possible co star but did not appear in the final film. Jody McCrea made an early appearance.

Filming started 14 November 1960.

It was photographed in CinemaScope and DeLuxe Color.

Release
The studio did not create a pressbook to market the film in the rush to release it.  Instead, the studio's marketing of the film centered on interviews with the cast.

Diabolique magazine says "The racism against native Americans here is both casual and formal, but it's a rare Hollywood film at the time where they are shown to have some status in the modern world... It is all done with high spirits. Boone is quite animated, and it is a relaxed performance: his best to date. The Meisner training did pay off. Director Norman Taurog worked several times with Elvis Presley, and this feels like it could have been a Presley vehicle."

Songs
The film features four songs by Ray Evans and Jay Livingston:
 All Hands on Deck
 Somewhere There's Home
 There's No One Like You
 I've Got It Made

References

External links
 
 
 
 
 All Hands on Deck review at The New York Times

1961 films
1961 musical comedy films
20th Century Fox films
American musical comedy films
1960s English-language films
Films based on military novels
Films directed by Norman Taurog
Films scored by Cyril J. Mockridge
Military humor in film
Films about the United States Navy
1960s American films